South Run is a census-designated place in Fairfax County, Virginia, United States. The population as of the 2010 census was 6,389.

Geography
The South Run CDP is in southern Fairfax County, bordered to the northwest by Burke Lake Park, to the north by Burke, to the east by Newington Forest, and to the south by Crosspointe. The CDP's borders are formed by the Fairfax County Parkway (Virginia Route 286) to the north; Hooes Road to the east; South Run, a tributary of South Run, and Silverbrook Road to the south; and Ox Road (Virginia State Route 123) to the southwest.

South Run, a tributary of Pohick Creek and part of the Potomac River watershed, flows from west to east through the center of CDP. At the southeast corner of the CDP it is impounded as Lake Mercer.

References

Census-designated places in Fairfax County, Virginia
Washington metropolitan area
Census-designated places in Virginia